Jorge Hernández may refer to:
Jorge Hernández (cyclist) (born 1948), Colombian Olympic cyclist
Jorge Hernández (boxer) (born 1954), retired boxer from Cuba
Jorge Hernández (sailor) (born 1965), Puerto Rican Olympic sailor
Jorge Hernández Hernández (born 1965), Mexican politician
Jorge Luis Hernández (born 1978), Cuban volleyball player
Jorge Hernández (footballer, born 1988), Mexican football midfielder
Jorge Hernández (footballer, born 1989), Mexican football midfielder
Jorge Hernandez (footballer, born 1992), Spanish winger
Jorge Hernandez (soccer, born 2000), American soccer player